Clydestone Ghana is a Ghanaian information and communications technology company. They are listed on the stock index of the Ghana Stock Exchange, the GSE All-Share Index. Formed in June 1989, operates in the Area of Payment Systems - Cheque Truncation and ACH Systems, G-switch (Global Switch) a transaction processing company, G-secure an Issuer and Acquirer Authentication Platform for Visa, MasterCard, American Express, Union Pay International

External links
Clydestone Ghana Official Website
Clydestone Ghana at Alacrastore

References 

Companies established in 1989
Companies listed on the Ghana Stock Exchange
Information technology companies of Ghana
Companies based in Accra